Vereyken Glacier is a glacier in Victoria Land, Antarctica. Together with the Morning Glacier, it drains the northeast slopes of Mount Morning. Vereyken Glacier flows north between Riviera Ridge and Hurricane Ridge into Koettlitz Glacier. It was named by the Advisory Committee on Antarctic Names (US-ACAN) (1994) after Jill Vereyken, ASA manager of Field Support Services at McMurdo Station, who was active in coordination and planning of science support in Antarctica from 1984.

Glaciers of Scott Coast